The Hornby Mountains (or "hills") are a mountain range on West Falkland in the Falkland Islands.  Mount Maria is a mountain in this range. The range runs in a group of ridges parallel to Falkland Sound

The Hornby Mountains, have experienced tectonic forces of uplift and folding by which the quartzite beds of Argentine Port are inclined to the vertical.

References

External links
 

Mountains of West Falkland
Mountain ranges of South America
Landforms of the Falkland Islands